Thakur Ram Singh may refer to:
 Thakur Ram Singh (1915–2009) Rashtriya Swayamsevak Sangh pracharak and founder of Akhil Bharatiya Itihas Sankalan Yojana
 Thakur Ram Singh (revolutionary) (1911–2009), Indian communist revolutionary and associate of Bhagat Singh
 Ram Singh Thakuri (1914–2002), Indian Gorkha freedom fighter

See also 
 S. G. Thakur Singh (1899–1976), Indian artist
 Thakur Vishva Narain Singh (1928–2009), Indian journalist and Braille editor